Arbelodes is a genus of moths in the family Metarbelidae.

Species
 Arbelodes agassizi  Lehmann, 2010 
 Arbelodes albitorquata  (Hampson, 1910)
 Arbelodes claudiae  Lehmann, 2010 
 Arbelodes collaris Aurivillius, 1921
 Arbelodes deprinsi  Lehmann, 2010 
 Arbelodes dicksoni  Lehmann, 2010 
 Arbelodes dupreezi  Lehmann, 2010 
 Arbelodes flavicolor  (Janse, 1925)
 Arbelodes franziskae  Lehmann, 2010 
 Arbelodes goellnerae Mey, 2012
 Arbelodes griseata Janse, 1925
 Arbelodes haberlandorum  Lehmann, 2010 
 Arbelodes heringi  (Janse, 1930) 
 Arbelodes iridescens  (Janse, 1925)
 Arbelodes kroonae  Lehmann, 2007 
 Arbelodes kruegeri  Lehmann, 2010 
 Arbelodes meridialis  Karsch, 1896 (= Arbelodes meridionalis von Dalla Torre & Strand, 1923)
 Arbelodes mondeensis  Lehmann, 2010 
 Arbelodes prochesi  Lehmann, 2010
 Arbelodes sebelensis  Lehmann, 2010
 Arbelodes shimonii  Lehmann, 2010
 Arbelodes sticticosta  (Hampson, 1910)
 Arbelodes varii  Lehmann, 2010

Former species
 Arbelodes albivenata Hampson, 1910
 Arbelodes bisinuata Hampson, 1920
 Arbelodes castanea Gaede, 1929
 Arbelodes diagonalis Hampson, 1910
 Arbelodes guttata Aurivillius, 1910
 Arbelodes minima Hampson, 1920
 Arbelodes obliquifascia Hampson, 1910
 Arbelodes rufula Hampson, 1910
 Arbelodes semifasciata Gaede, 1929
 Arbelodes tetrasticta Hampson, 1910

References

 , 1896. Die Hollandiiden oder die äthiopischen Arbeliden W.J. Holland's. Entomologische Nachrichten, 22(9): 135–141.
 , 2010: A revision of the genus Arbelodes Karsch (Lepidoptera:Cossoidea:Metarbelidae) from southeast-central and southern Africa with the description of thirteen new species. Published by the author. Hamburg, 82 pages, 8 b/w plates, 5 colour plates. Full article: .
 , 2011: New and little known species of Lepidoptera of southwestern Africa. Esperiana Buchreihe zur Entomologie Memoir 6: 146–261.
 , 2012: Arbelodes goellnerae sp. nov. aus dem südlichen Namibia (Lepidoptera: Cossoidea, Metarbelidae). Entomologische Zeitschrift 122 (3): 103–105.

External links
Natural History Museum Lepidoptera generic names catalog

Metarbelinae